Fort Washington may refer to:

Events
 Battle of Fort Washington, during the American Revolutionary War

Places

United States
 Fort Washington, a sub-post of Fort Adams, Mississippi, near Washington in the Mississippi Territory
 Fort Washington, California, a census-designated place
 Fort Washington (Manhattan), former American Revolutionary War-era fort in Manhattan, New York City
 Fort Washington, Maryland, a census-designated place
Fort Washington Park, a historic fort that guarded Washington, DC
 Fort Washington (Massachusetts), an American Revolutionary War-era earthworks in Cambridge, near M.I.T.
 Fort Washington (Ohio), former frontier outpost in Cincinnati
 Fort Washington, Pennsylvania, census designated place
 Fort Washington Avenue, New York City
 Fort Washington Park (New York City), 160-acre park in Washington Heights, Manhattan, New York City
 Fort Washington station
 Fort Washington State Park
 Fort Washington Way, an expressway that carries Interstate 71 and US Route 50 in downtown Cincinnati

See also
 Port Washington (disambiguation)
 The Saint of Fort Washington, a film